The British University Gaelic football Championship is an annual Gaelic football tournament held for universities in Great Britain. It is organised by the BUGAA which is a branch of the Higher Education GAA committee which oversees Gaelic Games in Universities. The competition is also overseen by British Universities and Colleges Sport (BUCS). In GAA in Ireland trophies have tended to be named after Irish patriots or long-serving officials or heroic players, whereas the Irish diaspora at British Universities have perpetuated the names of young students who died soon after helping to establish Gaelic Games in British Universities. The Gaelic Football Championship Trophy, The Kevin Fallon Trophy, commemorates a Crewe & Alsager student who helped to organise the original competition in 1991. See also the British University Hurling Championship.

History 
The first attempt to start a British colleges Gaelic football tournament was in 1989, but it lapsed the following year and was revived in 1991 by the University of Crewe and Alsager who hosted and won a five-team tournament. In 1992 Newcastle and Sunderland Universities hosted a ten-team event on converted rugby pitches, and St. Mary's, Strawberry Hill (London) took the first of its titles. The British Universities' Gaelic football Championship—as it then became—started back in the 1992/93 academic session. Twelve teams congregated on Páirc na hÉireann, Catherine-de-Barns Lane, Solihull, Birmingham, with Swansea recording Wales' first and only club championship success thus far. The competition had found its true 'home', both in terms of geography and facilities, and there it has remained ever since.

The number of participants had risen to sixteen by 1994, but in 1995 an uncharacteristically heavy snowfall rendered the Páirc na hÉireann pitches unplayable, and the competition had to be cancelled.
Although officially cancelled, eight of the 16 teams had already travelled to Birmingham and a hastily arranged tournament was played at a pitch in Erdington, with Luton University defeating Newcastle University in a keenly fought final.

The experience led to a championship review, arising out of which it was decided to divide Britain into four regions. Thus from 1996 the regions held their own qualification schemes, each sending two qualifying teams to the finals weekend.

The quota was raised to three teams per region in 1997, thus making for a 12-team weekend. In 1999 Joe McDonagh became the first GAA President to attend the British Universities' championships, and his lead has been followed by his successor, Seán McCague in 2001 and 2002.

In 2011 the University of Glasgow fronted by Mickey Hicks and Rory McKeever won the Division 3 Championship.

In Division B, The final was won by Bangor University. They were in jerseys of pink.

Division A was won by a Liverpool John Moore's who took their 7th title in the British University GAA's 20-year history back to Merseyside.

In 2012 Liverpool Hope University avenged previous final defeats by claiming their first ever title, beating their city rivals John Moores in a scoreline of 1–8 to 0–9 after extra time, With Hope's Paraic McGuirk being named MVP for the championships.

British University GAA Championship Finals by Year

Championship (Division 1)
The winners of the Championship (Division 1) use to qualify to play in the Trench Cup—which is the Division 2 Championship for universities in Ireland—at the semi-final stage. Now teams qualify to play in the Corn Na Mac Lenin which is the Division 3 Championship in Ireland. In 2004 St. Mary's Strawberry Hill, London won the Trench Cup competition. In 2007 Liverpool John Moores University qualified for the final of Trench Cup by beating University of Ulster Coleraine 1–9 to 0–9. In 2018, Liverpool Hope University won the Corn na Mac Leinn by beating University of Ulster, Magee 2–14 to 1–8. 

§ Incorporated in Manchester Metropolitan University in 1992
* Only eight of the sixteen teams competed due to heavy snowfall in Birmingham

Roll of Honour
 9 – Liverpool John Moores University
 8 – St. Mary's University, Twickenham
 5 – Liverpool Hope University
 1 – Robert Gordon University, Swansea University, University of Abertay, University of Dundee, Luton University, Edinburgh Napier University, Manchester Metropolitan University

Championship (Division 2)

* University of Central Lancashire

Championship (Division 3)
The prize for the third division of BU Gaelic football is the plate. The following are the winners and finalists of this tournament:

References

External links
BU GAA Website
Aston Gaels GAA

Gaelic football competitions in the United Kingdom
Gaelic football
1990 establishments in the United Kingdom
Recurring sporting events established in 1990